Ian Noble (born 6 April 1972) is a Zimbabwean former rugby union and rugby league footballer who played in the 1990s and 2000s, and has coached rugby union in the 2010s.

Background
Ian Noble was born in Bulawayo, Rhodesia

Noble represented Zimbabwe at the 1991 Rugby Union World Cup and South Africa in the 2000 Rugby League World Cup. As of 2010, he is the head coach of Irvine RFC.

Playing career
Noble originally played rugby union for Zimbabwe. Attending the 1991 Rugby World Cup and playing 7 matches between 1993 and 1996, scoring 66 points.

When he was in South Africa playing for Mpumalanga, Noble changed codes and played rugby league for South Africa in the 2000 Rugby League World Cup.

Noble then moved to Britain and played for several clubs, including the Glasgow Hawks.

He later became a coach. In 2010, he was appointed head coach of Irvine RFC.

References

1972 births
Living people
Rugby league wingers
Rugby union centres
South Africa national rugby league team players
Sportspeople from Bulawayo
White Zimbabwean sportspeople
Zimbabwe international rugby union players
Zimbabwean rugby league players
Zimbabwean rugby union coaches
Zimbabwean rugby union players